Spilarctia bifascia is a moth in the family Erebidae. It was described by George Hampson in 1891. It is found in the Nilgiris District of India.

References

Moths described in 1891
bifascia